The 2000 Tennessee Titans season was the franchise’s 41st season and their 31st in the National Football League (NFL). It was the team’s second as the “Titans.” The team entered the season as the defending AFC Champions, having narrowly lost Super Bowl XXXIV to the St. Louis Rams.

Tennessee’s 13–3 record was the best in the NFL in 2000, and earned the Titans a first-round bye and home-field advantage throughout the playoffs. In the Titans’ first playoff game, however, they were upset by their pre-realignment division rivals, fourth-seeded Baltimore Ravens, who would go on to win the Super Bowl.

The 2006 edition of Pro Football Prospectus, listed the 2000 Titans as one of their “Heartbreak Seasons”, in which teams “dominated the entire regular season only to falter in the playoffs, unable to close the deal.”

Said Pro Football Prospectus of the 2000 Titans,

Pro Football Prospectus continued

Offseason

NFL Draft

Personnel

Staff

Roster

Schedule

Preseason

Regular season

Standings

Playoffs

AFC Divisional Playoff 

Despite having only 134 yards of total offense, six first downs, and two punts blocked by Chris Coleman, the Ravens broke a 10–10 tie in the fourth quarter with Anthony Mitchell's 90-yard touchdown return of a blocked Al Del Greco field goal and then added seven more with a 50-yard interception return by Ray Lewis.

Awards and records 
 Led NFL, Average Time of Possession (33 minutes, 48 seconds per game)
 Led NFL, Pass Defense
 Led NFL, Total Defense
 Eddie George, PFW/PFWA All-Pro Team
 Derrick Mason, Associated Press All-Pro
 Derrick Mason, All-NFL Team (as selected by the Associated Press, Pro Football Weekly, and the Pro Football Writers of America)
 Derrick Mason, NFL Special Teams Player of the Month, October
 Derrick Mason, Pro Football Writers of America All-Pro Team
 Bruce Matthews, All-NFL Team (as selected by the Associated Press, Pro Football Weekly, and the Pro Football Writers of America)
 Bruce Matthews, Associated Press All-Pro
 Bruce Matthews, PFW/PFWA All-Pro Team
 Samari Rolle, Associated Press All-Pro
 Samari Rolle, All-NFL Team (as selected by the Associated Press, Pro Football Weekly, and the Pro Football Writers of America)
 Samari Rolle, Pro Football Writers of America All-Pro Team

Notes

References 

 Titans on Pro Football Reference
 Titans on jt-sw.com

Tennessee Titans
Tennessee Titans seasons
AFC Central championship seasons
Titans